KEDM (90.3 FM) is the listener-supported public radio station for Monroe, West Monroe, and all or parts of eleven parishes of northeast Louisiana and four counties in southeast Arkansas. It is owned by the University of Louisiana at Monroe.

The station broadcasts a lineup of in-depth NPR news; classical, roots and a variety of other musical genres; and special entertainment and other programs.

History
KEDM signed on April 23, 1991. It began broadcasting in HD Radio on its 18th birthday, April 23, 2009, becoming the first station to do so in the region; its HD2 subchannel was KEDM Ideas, a 24-hour news and information subchannel.

KEDM features a regional nighttime format called The Boot. It showcases Louisiana and local artists and highlights music from the delta.

References

External links
 

Radio stations in Louisiana
Mass media in Monroe, Louisiana
College radio stations in Louisiana
University of Louisiana at Monroe
NPR member stations
Radio stations established in 1991
1991 establishments in Louisiana